Buyao is a type of Chinese women's hair ornament. It is a type of Chinese hairpin which was often times decorated with carved designs and jewelries that dangles when the wearer walks, hence the name, which literally means "shake as you go". The buyao is similar to a zan hairpin, except for the presence of its dangling ornaments, which are its primary featured characteristics. The buyao appeared as early as in the Han dynasty, where only noble women in the royal family could wear it. In ancient times, the use of buyao denoted noble status.  Some noble women also put buyaos on their tiaras, making their hair decoration more luxurious than simple buyao. Common material used in making the buyao was gold; the ornaments were typically jade and pearls. Other valuable materials could be used, such as silver, agate, etc. Many centuries after the fall of the Han dynasty, the buyao was introduced to ordinary civilians; and when all women were allowed to wear to it, more variety of materials were used to produce them. Buyao was passed down over generations; buyao decorated with pendants are still popular in modern day China.

History
The wearing of buyao were fashionable during the  Han, Wei, Jin, Northern and Southern dynasties. During this period, there were two types of buyao: the buyao flower and the buyao crown. The buyao flower was more prevailing in the Central plains and in the Southern dynasties and was worn by women only whereas the buyao crown was worn by both men and women in the Yan and Dai regions, which were the location where the ancient Xianbei resided. These two forms of buyao were influenced by the gold crown culture of the nomadic tribes who lived in the grasslands of Central Asia however, the cultural differences between the Central plains and the Yan-Dai areas contributed in the difference in shapes, wearing fashion, aesthetics preferences and meaning of historical culture, etc.

Han dynasty 

During the Western Han period, buyaos were created and adopted the style of the Western region's accessories, and became popular. The earliest depiction of buyao so far can be found on the Mawangdui tomb funeral banner which shows Lady Dai wearing a buyao which was painting in the Western Han dynasty. 

In ancient Chinese texts, the buyao is largely defined in terms of their structure. For examples, according to the Shiming in the section Shi toushi, it is written that: "The top of a buyao has hanging beads, and when one takes a step, they sway 

()."The Hanshu mention the buyao guan worn by an official in the Jiang Chong zhuan: "Chong wore gauzy diaphanous robe, and the overlapping curved panels of his robes hung down in back. He wore on his head a sheer head covering and a buyao cap [also known as buyao crown], and fluttering feather tassels.

()"During this period, the buyao was not only worn by the Han Chinese but also by the Wuhuan women who would grow their hair long, divide it into buns and decorate their hair with hairpins and buyao. The buyao were worn also by the Han dynasty empresses; according to the Yufu zhi of the Hou Han shu:"When empresses dressed to visit the ancestral shrine, they wore dark purple on the top and black on the bottom, silkworms, and greenish black on the top and pure white on the bottom. The dress code was all dark clothing, and silk ribbons were used to hide the edges of the collar and sleeves. [They wore] fake chignons, buyao, hairpins, and ear ornaments. Their buyao used gold for the mountain-shaped frontal piece, and white pearls were strung on the intertwining cassia branches. [They wore] a sparrow and nine flowers, and the six beasts: the bear, tiger, red bear, heavenly deer, bixie, and the grand cow from Nanshan.

()".At the time of the Eastern Han Dynasty, the buyao was introduced to Japan.

Wei, Jin, Northern and Southern dynasties 

According to the Yufu zhi of the Jin shu also mentioned that the palace ladies from Western Han through Jin wore buyao in their hair as hair ornaments. Buyao are depicted in the Admonitions Scroll attributed to Gu Kaizhi as a pair of zan, a type of Chinese hairpin, decorated with delicate ornaments which are shaped like birds and sits on delicate branches which extend out like blooming flowers and when the wearer would walk, the thin branches would move slightly causing any hairpin ornaments or beads to shake. The buyao worn by the court ladies in the Admonitions Scroll might have been variants or lower-ranking variants of those worn by the empresses.

Buyao made of gold appear to be representative head ornaments of the early elite culture of the Murong Xianbei. The Murong, similarly to the people of Buyeo, wore gold ornaments which had dangling leaves called buyao guan; they looked like golden-leaf and tree-like head ornaments and were worn by both men and women; they were however different from the Chinese buyao which were only worn by women.

According to the Murong Hui zaiji (lit. 'Chronicles of Murong Hui') of the Jin shu, Mo Huba, the Murong Xianbei leader, introduced the buyao ornaments to his people by copying it from the Chinese. Initially, the Murong clan lived in the Liaodong regions, but during the Cao Wei dynasty, they migrated to the Liaoxi regions. When Mo Huba saw the people of Yan and Dai wearing the buyao guan, he ordered all his people to tie their hair and wear the buyao guan. The buyao crown largely disappeared when the Tuoba Xianbei conquered Northern China.

Tang dynasty 
In the Tang dynasty, golden buyao which were decorated with flowers and birds were favoured by the Empresses. The Tang dynasty empresses would attach their buyao to their ceremonial wig. Buyao were also worn by the Tang dynasty upper-class women.

Types and designs
Dragons and phoenix designs were typically used to decorate the buyao Other shapes and decorations included:
 Bixie design – a symbol to ward off ill luck and maintain happiness,
 Birds, and other winged animals; 
 Butterfly,
 Flowers,
 Tassels and pendants, and
 Valuable gemstones.

See also 

 Fengguan - Phoenix crown
 Shubi - Chinese comb
 Hanfu accessories

Notes

References

Decorative arts
Chinese fashion
Chinese headgear